The High Rhine is the name used for the part of the Rhine that flows westbound from Lake Constance to Basel. The High Rhine begins at the outflow of the Rhine from the Untersee in Stein am Rhein and turns into the Upper Rhine in Basel. In contrast to the Alpine Rhine and Upper Rhine, the High Rhine flows mostly to the west.

The section is marked by Rhine-kilometers 0 to 165, measurements beginning at the outflow of the Obersee at the Old Rhine Bridge in Constance. It is the first of four sections (High Rhine, Upper Rhine, Middle Rhine, Lower Rhine) of the Rhine between Lake Constance and the North Sea. In the western part, the Rhine marks the border between Germany and Switzerland, while in the eastern part, Switzerland owns areas north of the Rhine and surrounds the popular German holiday resort of Büsingen am Hochrhein.

The term High Rhine was introduced by scientists in the 19th century.

Above all geologists tried to differentiate the High Rhine linguistically from the Upper Rhine. Until the 19th century, it was also known as the "Badisch-Swiss Rhine".

Waterfalls and rapids 

The Rhine Falls, which are the largest plain waterfalls of Europe, are in the municipalities of Neuhausen am Rheinfall and Laufen-Uhwiesen, near the town of Schaffhausen.

In Neuhausen am Rheinfall, the river falls into a previously buried stream channel, forming the 
Rhine Falls at Schaffhausen. The next rapids are the Kadelburg Rapids at Koblenz. Near Laufenburg, the post-glacial Rhine failed to find the old silted-up channel and hit a spur of Black Forest crystal. The river cut itself a gorge, containing the Laufenburg Rapids. The Laufenburg and Schwörstadt Rapids have been artificially eliminated by blowing up the rocks and raising the water level with dams.

Interventions 

The character of the river has been changed over long distances by the construction of hydropower station. The Laufenburg and Schwörstadt Rapids were removed by blowing up rocks, originally to improve navigation, and later flooded due to the hydropower dams.

Between Diessenhofen and Stein am Rhein, the High Rhine has yet to be dammed. The first power plant of the Rhine is currently at Schaffhausen; it has a damming effect to slightly above Diessenhofen. The next power plant (the Kraftwerk Reckingen) is located at Rekingen and Küssaberg. After Rekingen, the High Rhine flows freely through the Koblenz Rapids to the confluence with the Aare. The next hydropower plant (the Kraftwerk Albbruck-Dogern), is at Leibstadt and Dogern. There are seven more power plant between here and Basel. Altogether, the High Rhine has eleven dams and twelve hydropower plants (there are two plants at the Augst/Wyhlen Dam.

Geography

Towns 
Some parts of the High Rhine valley are fairly wide; others are more gorge-like. The population density varies accordingly. Prominent towns on the High Rhine include Stein am Rhein, Schaffhausen, Neuhausen am Rheinfall, Waldshut, Laufenburg, Bad Säckingen, Rheinfelden and Basel.

The most important organizations for cross-border cooperation on the High Rhine are High Rhine Commission and High Rhine Agency.

Tributaries 
Larger tributaries of the High Rhine are Biber, Thur, Töss, Glatt, Wutach, Aare, Alb, Murg, Sissle, Wehra, Ergolz and Birs.

From hydrological point of view, therefore, the Rhine is a tributary of the Aare, not vice versa. The Rhine is, however, generally considered the main stream, because it is slightly longer than the Aare.

Areas 
Numerous areas along the High Rhine are currently, or were historically considered important. From west to east, they are Dinkelberg, Augstgau, Fricktal, Tabel Jura, Albgau, Aargau, Hotzenwald, Klettgau, Zurzibiet, Zürichgau and Thurgau.

Authorities on the Baden-Württemberg side of the river are organized in a framework called Regionalverband Hochrhein-Bodensee ("Regional cooperation High Rhine — Lake Constance").

See also
High Rhine Railway

References 
 Andreas Gruschke: Der Hochrhein. Eine alemannische Flusslandschaft. Schillinger, Freiburg im Breisgau, 1995,

Footnotes

External links

 Rhine Falls homepage
 Photographs of the Rhine Falls
 Spanish guide
 High Rhine:Pictures
 High Rhine Commission and High Rhine Agency

Rhine, High
Rhine, High
 
Regions of Baden-Württemberg
Rivers of the canton of St. Gallen
Rivers of Thurgau
Rivers of Germany